Elia Grossi (born 3 June 1974) is an Italian former professional tennis player.

Grossi, a native of Florence, reached a career high singles ranking of 212. He made his only ATP Tour singles main draw appearance in the 1997 edition of the San Marino Open and featured in the doubles main draw of the 2001 Rome Masters. His sister Marzia played on the WTA Tour.

ITF Futures titles

Singles: (3)

Doubles: (2)

References

External links
 
 

1974 births
Living people
Italian male tennis players
Sportspeople from Florence
20th-century Italian people
21st-century Italian people